The Port of Dumaguete, is a seaport in Dumaguete, Philippines. It is owned and managed by the Philippine Ports Authority and is the baseport of the Port Management Office Negros Oriental/Siquijor.

After upgrade works were made in the port, the port was inaugurated on March 11, 2021 by President Rodrigo Duterte and Transportation Secretary Arthur Tugade.

Shipping firms and destinations
Cokaliong Shipping Lines - Cebu City and Dapitan
Medallion Transport - Dipolog
Lite Ferries - Cebu City, Dapitan and Cagayan de Oro
FastCat - Dapitan
Montenegro Lines - Siquijor town, Larena, Siquijor, and Dapitan
Aleson Shipping Lines - Dapitan
2GO Travel - Manila, Zamboanga City
OceanJet - Cebu City, Tagbilaran, Larena, Siquijor and Siquijor, Siquijor
'''Gothong Lines - Cebu City

Statistics

See also
List of ports in the Philippines
Dumaguete

References

Dumaguete
Dumaguete Port
Buildings and structures in Dumaguete